The Labyrinth of Time is a graphic adventure video game created by Terra Nova Development, a two-man team composed of Bradley W. Schenck and Michal Todorovic. Intended to be the first in a series of games, The Labyrinth of Time was less successful than similar graphic adventures released around the same time, such as The 7th Guest and Myst. It is the sole game produced by Terra Nova Development. In the years after its release, The Labyrinth of Time was published on more recent platforms by The Wyrmkeep Entertainment Co. in collaboration with the original developers.

Plot 
The story of The Labyrinth of Time is loosely based on Greek mythology. The game begins during player's commute home from work. While aboard the subway, the player and their train car are suddenly sucked into an alternate dimension. An illusion in the form of the mythological character Daedalus explains that King Minos has forced him to oversee the construction of a labyrinth that spans the space-time continuum. Upon its construction, King Minos will invade and conquer all times and places with his supernatural powers. Daedalus pleads for the player to find a way to destroy the labyrinth before Minos can complete his conquest.

In-game terminals and journal entries reveal the extent of Minos's power. As explained by the lone archivist on a lunar library, a figure identifying himself as the king appeared simultaneously to all world governments in all time periods, seizing control of their militaries and erasing all written history. Minos's new abilities seem to extend beyond time travel; the scene of the king's tomb strongly implies that he rose from the grave.

The labyrinth that the player explores spans many time periods and locations. Despite their incongruity, each area is thematically connected by the story of Martin Garret, a professor intrigued with discovering the tomb of the unnamed Sorcerer-King at a far-off ziggurat near Uxmal. Desperado Mad Dog Maddigan, the one man who knew the location of the Sorcerer-King's treasure chamber, was buried in the Western town of Revolver Springs, California, along with a map to the ziggurat's chamber. Revolver Springs, however, was destroyed in a fire on May 1, 1882, leaving the location of his grave a mystery. Garret was about to begin his second expedition to the ziggurat, but suffered from anxiety after losing his lucky shirt in a previous dig.

When the player finds the ziggurat, they can retrieve the shirt. They are also able to go back in time to Revolver Springs and pick up a newspaper explaining that the local graves were relocated to make way for a railroad extension project. The player leaves both for Garret to receive, changing history. With the encouragement and new information, Garret locates Mad Dog Maddigan and completes his expedition. Among the treasures brought back from the Sorcerer-King's tomb, Garret discovers a talisman that was reputedly used to destroy buildings.

The player must operate three levers in the ziggurat to reach the center of the labyrinth and take, among other items, the talisman to destroy its keystone. After dispelling an illusory Minotaur guarding the Maze Center, the player breaks the maze's keystone. This causes the labyrinth to unfurl at the seams. Daedalus appears in person to offer thanks for his freedom, then leaves to ensure King Minos can do no more harm. He leaves the player floating in an area that does not exist in time or space.

The game ends with a teaser for a sequel, The Labyrinth II: Lost in the Land of Dreams. The sequel was never produced.

Re-release 
On December 7, 2004, The Labyrinth of Time was re-released by The Wyrmkeep Entertainment Co. for the Microsoft Windows, Mac OS, AmigaOS, and Linux. The new versions of the game restored some audio quality and added a breadcrumbs feature for navigating mazes, as well as porting the original code to Simple DirectMedia Layer. The Amiga version was released as freeware and can be downloaded from Aminet and its mirrors or as an .iso from the official site.

The game was later ported to Apple's iPhone and iPod Touch on November 14, 2009. It is at present available for purchase or download on the online game stores Steam and GOG.com.

Reception
Computer Gaming Worlds Charles Ardai in December 1993 admitted that expecting The Labyrinth of Time to not have a maze was unrealistic. He stated, however, that although "pretend[ing] to be a piece of interactive fiction", it was "almost nothing but mazes, linked end to  end in a complex, irritating chain". Ardai criticized the "relentless stylish visuals" as "eye-candy and boring eye-candy at that", with no way to distinguish between the few objects necessary for gameplay and the many non-interactive ones. He advised Electronic Arts to "dismantle The Labyrinth of Time and sell it cut-rate for clip art". In April 1994 the magazine said that "Though mythology and time travel interbreed seamlessly, its depressingly empty world and staid adventure game mechanics create a game that is less than timeless".

In 1996, Computer Gaming World declared Labyrinth of Time the 43rd-worst computer game ever released.

In January 1994, PC Gamer UK awarded the game its "Recommended" seal, with reviewer Phil South giving it a 91% rating.  South defined the game as quick, hot and deep: "Quick because it takes no time at all to get into [...]. Hot because its state-of-the-art presentation because it makes it both look good and sound like a million bucks [...]. Deep because, once you get over the initial novelty and start to want something to occupy you for a while, the game has enough bite to keep you enthralled for as long as you're prepared to put the effort in, with puzzles and problems to tax experienced and neophyte adventurers alike".

In February 1994, PC Zone also recommended the game, giving it a score of 89 out of 100. Reviewer Paul Presley criticized the game's "less than user-friendly interface", stating that there's "far too many mouse clicks to do far too few things", while highly praised the visuals and sound, which "produce an atmosphere unrivalled in an adventure game since The 7th Guest".

The One gave the Amiga version of The Labyrinth of Time an overall score of 81%, referring to the music as "nothing short of brilliant", and praising the graphics, stating that "Labyrinth Of Time's obvious selling point is its graphics ... Unfortunately, the adventure itself doesn't quite come across as being as impressive as the graphics." The One expressed that the "packaging itself gives no indication of the down-beat nature of the game ... [the intro outlining backstory events] come as an unpleasant surprise" and criticized the mazes, stating that the auto-map negates their purpose, making them "nothing more than tedious", and were frustrated by the "dated" and "limiting" UI.

References

External links 
Wyrmkeep Entertainment Co.'s Labyrinth of Time website
The Labyrinth of Time iOS port website

Interview with Joe Pearce of Wyrmkeep Entertainment on Labyrinth of Time re-release
Bradley W. Schenck's personal art site

1993 video games
Adventure games
Amiga games
Amiga CD32 games
DOS games
Electronic Arts games
Freeware games
IOS games
Linux games
Classic Mac OS games
ScummVM-supported games
Video games about time travel
Video games based on Greek mythology
Windows games
Video games developed in the United States
Single-player video games